Flahavan's is an Irish milling company which has been run by the Flahavan family since about 1785 located in the village of Kilmacthomas. The current chairman is John Flahavan.

The original mill was a watermill driven by the River Mahon in Kilmacthomas, County Waterford. Nowadays, the Flahavan's factory produces oats-based breakfast cereals, rolled oats, cereals, muesli, flour, snack products, and baked oat products.

References

External links
 Flahavan's website
 Tour of Flahavan's mill

Food companies of the Republic of Ireland
Companies established in 1785